William Hird (23 September 1921 – 15 April 2014) was an Australian cricketer. He played eighteen first-class matches for Tasmania between 1952 and 1961.

See also
 List of Tasmanian representative cricketers

References

External links
 

1921 births
2014 deaths
Australian cricketers
Tasmania cricketers
People from Stanley, County Durham
Cricketers from County Durham